Metastachydium is a genus of flowering plant in the family Lamiaceae, first described with this name in 1977. It contains only one known species, Metastachydium sagittatum, native to central Asia (Kyrgyzstan, Xinjiang).

References

Lamiaceae
Flora of Central Asia
Monotypic Lamiaceae genera